Domènech is a common Catalan surname. Its variants are Domènec, Domenech and Doménech. It can also be found sometimes as a given name.

People

As surname 
Adrián Domenech, a retired Argentine football player and former coach of Argentinos Juniors
Agustina Saragossa Domènech, or Agustina of Aragón, a heroine who defended the city of Zaragoza during the Spanish War of Independence, ALSO KNOWN AS "the Spanish Joan of Arc"
Albert Crusat Domènech, a retired Catalan football player who spent most of his professional career with UD Almería
Amédée Domenech, a French former rugby union player mostly for CA Brive and former player of the French national team, who afterwards became a politician for the Radical Party
Ben Domenech, a conservative writer and blogger
Douglas Domenech, the Deputy Chief of Staff of the United States Department of the Interior
Emmanuel-Henri-Dieudonné Domenech, a French abbé, missionary and author
Ernest Urtasun Domènech, a Catalan politician for Initiative for Catalonia Greens, diplomat and economist
Francisco Domenech, the Director of the Office of Legislative Services of Puerto Rico
Jaume Domènech Sánchez, a Spanish professional football player known for playing at Valencia CF
Josep Caballé Domènech, a Catalan musician and conductor
Josep Domènech i Estapà, a Catalan architect
Lluís Domènech i Montaner, a highly influential Catalan architect from the Catalan Art Nouveau (Modernisme), prominent politician and Catalan nationalist
Manuel Guijarro Doménech, a former Spanish racing cyclist
Manuel V. Domenech, a Puerto Rican politician
Maria Domènech i Escoté, a Catalan writer
Raymond Domenech, a former French football player and the former manager of the French national team
Salvador Dalí i Domènech, prominent Catalan surrealist painter, best known for his painting of melting clocks and probably the most world-famous surrealist artist
Sergio Doménech, a Spanish judoka
Xavier Domenech i Sampere, a Catalan historian, activist and politician, spokesperson for En Comú Podem electoral coalition

As given name 
Domènec Balmanya i Perera, also referred to as Domingo Balmaña, is a former Catalan footballer and manager who spent most of his playing career at FC Barcelona
Domènec Batet i Mestres, a Catalan military man
Domènec Fita i Molat, a Catalan sculptor
Domènec Sugrañes i Gras, a Catalan modernist architect and disciple of Antoni Gaudí
Domènech Terradellas, a Spanish opera composer

Catalan-language surnames
Catalan masculine given names